Guy Helminger (born 1963) is a Luxembourgish author who has written a number of successful novels and plays in German.

Biography

Guy Helminger, the younger brother of author Nico Helminger, was born on 20 January 1963 in Esch-sur-Alzette in south-western Luxembourg. He studied German literature and philosophy in Luxembourg, Heidelberg and Cologne where he has lived since 1985. His literary work includes poetry, drama and novels. His award-winning play Morgen ist Regen, translated into English as "Venezuela", was performed at London's Arcola Theatre in March 2003. 

In 2002, Helminger was awarded the Servais Prize for Rost, a collection of short stories.

Selected works

Guy Helminger, "Neubrasilien", Frankfut-am-Main: Eichborn, 2010. pp. 315  
Guy Helminger, "Morgen war schon", Frankfut-am-Main: Eichborn, 2007. pp. 331  
Guy Helminger, "Etwas fehlt immer", Frankfut-am-Main: Eichborn, 2007. pp. 268 
Guy Helminger, Manuel Andrack: "Die Ruhe der Schlammkröte", Kiepenheuer & Witsch: Cologne, 2007, 
Guy Helminger, Penny Black (translator), "Venezuela", London: Oberon Books, 2003, pp. 63 
Guy Helminger, "Rost", Echternach: Editions Phi, 2001, pp. 136

External links 
Guy Helminger in: NRW Literatur im Netz

References

Luxembourgian writers
1963 births
Luxembourgian novelists
People from Esch-sur-Alzette
Living people